Miss Croatia (Croatian: Miss Hrvatske) is a national beauty pageant in Croatia. Pageant held in Croatia since 1991, when Croatia gained its independence. The pageant is organized by the Miss Universe Croatia organization, with the winner representing Croatia in the Miss Universe pageant. The current titleholder is Franciela Krasić, who was crowned Miss Croatia 2020 on October 11, 2020. She will represent Croatia in the Miss Universe 2020 pageant. 

The first Miss Croatia was Vanja Kovačević, who was crowned in 1991. Since then, Croatia has had a total of 15 Miss Universe Croatia winners, with Ivana Vrdoljak being the most successful, having been crowned Miss Universe in 1998.

Miss World Croatia
Color key

Miss Earth Croatia
Color key

Miss Supranational Croatia
Color key

References

Croatia
Miss Croatia
Croatian awards